Daniel John Stapleton (14 May 1886 – 21 September 1968) was an Irish hurler. His championship career with the Kilkenny senior team lasted four seasons from 1904 until 1907, during which time he captained the team to the 1905 All-Ireland Championship.

Born outside Callan, County Kilkenny, Stapleton first played competitive hurling with Callan CBS. He later joined the Erin's Own club in Kilkenny, with whom he won a county championship medal in 1905.

Stapleton made his debut on the inter-county scene during the 1904 championship. Over the course of the following four seasons he won three All-Ireland medals as well as three Leinster medals. Stapleton also featured prominently on the Kilkenny teams that won the Railway Shield outright after three successive victories. 

In his private life Stapleton qualified as a chemist and opened a business in Kilkenny . An active member of the Irish Republican Army during the War of Independence, he later supported the Anglo-Irish Treaty and joined the National Army. Stapleton joined the Garda Síochána in 1932 and rose through the ranks to become head of the Technical Branch as well as the official State ballistics expert.

Honours

Erin's Own
Kilkenny Senior Hurling Championship (1): 1905

Kilkenny
All-Ireland Senior Hurling Championship (3): 1904, 1905, 1907
Leinster Senior Hurling Championship (3): 1904, 1905, 1907

References

1886 births
1968 deaths
Erin's Own (Kilkenny) hurlers
Kilkenny inter-county hurlers
All-Ireland Senior Hurling Championship winners